Rogelio Polesello (26 July 1939 – 6 July 2014) was an Argentine painter, muralist and sculptor. He was best known for making Op art (or optical art) known in Latin America. He won two Konex Awards; one in 1982 and another in 2012. He was born in Buenos Aires.

Rogelio Polesello studied at the Escuela Nacional de Bellas Artes Manuel Belgrano and the Escuela Nacional de Bellas Artes Prilidiano Pueyrredón, both in Buenos Aires. In 1959, he joined the Asociación Arte Nuevo, founded by Aldo Pellegrini and Carmelo Arden Quin. The paintings he included in his first solo exhibition at the Galería Peuser (Buenos Aires, 1959) followed the aesthetics of Op Art and were based on Gestalt theories. Their geometric forms, generally in black and white, added to or subtracted from the whole according to perceptive principles that produced specific optical effects.

Polesello died from a heart attack on 6 July 2014 in Buenos Aires. He was 75.

Solo exhibitions

 Galería Peuser, Buenos Aires, Argentina, 1959
 Galería Pizarro, Buenos Aires, Argentina, 1960
 Galería Lirolay, Buenos Aires, Argentina, 1961
 Galería Rubbers, Buenos Aires, Argentina, 1962
 Galería Bonino, Buenos Aires, Argentina, 1966
 Museo de Bellas Artes, Caracas, Venezuela, 1966
 Pinturas laicas, Galería del Techo, Caracas, Venezuela, 1966
 Centro de Artes Visuales del Instituto Torcuato Di Tella, Buenos Aires, Argentina, 1969
 Museo de Arte Moderno, México D.F., Mexico, 1974
 Progresiones, Salas Nacionales de Cultura, Palais de Glace, Buenos Aires, Argentina, 1995
 Galería Ruth Benzacar, Buenos Aires, Argentina, 1997
 Muestra antológica, Museo Nacional de Bellas Artes, Buenos Aires, Argentina, 2000
 Imanes, Sala Cronopios, Centro Cultural Recoleta, Buenos Aires, Argentina, 2005

Group exhibitions
 Premio De Ridder a la joven pintura, galeria Pizarro, Buenos Aires, 1959
 Grupo Boa, Galería Van Riel, Buenos Aires, Argentina, 1962
 Salón Esso de Artistas Plásticos de América Latina, Panamerican Union, Washington, United States, 1965
 The Emergent Decade: Latin American Painters and Painting in the 60s, Solomon R. Guggenheim Museum, New York, United States , 1966
 Premio George Braque, Museo Nacional de Bellas Artes, Buenos Aires, Argentina, 1968
 Grupo Boa, Sociedad Hebraica Argentina, Buenos Aires, Argentina, 1969
 Pintura argentina actual. Dos tendencias: geometría-surrealismo, Museo Nacional de Bellas Artes, Buenos Aires, Argentina, 1976
 Siglo XX argentino: arte y cultura, Centro Cultural Recoleta, Buenos Aires, Argentina, 1999

Collections

 Albright-Knox Art Gallery, Buffalo, New York, United States
 Blanton Museum, Austin, Texas, United States
 Lowe Art Museum, University of Miami, Florida, United States
 Cisneros Fontanals Art Foundation, Miami, Florida, United States
 Museo de Arte Contemporáneo, Caracas, Venezuela
 Museo de Arte Latinoamericano de Buenos Aires, Argentina
 Museo Nacional de Bellas Artes, Buenos Aires, Argentina
 Museo Rufino Tamayo, México D.F., Mexico
 Solomon R. Guggenheim Museum, New York, United States
 The Bronx Museum of Arts, New York, United States

Suggested bibliography

 Bayón, Damián. "Constructor con materiales nuevos: Polesello". In Rogelio Polesello. Buenos Aires: Galería Carmen Waugh, 1974
 Glusberg, Jorge. "La geometría sensible de Rogelio Polesello". In Rogelio Polesello. Buenos Aires: Ruth Benzacar Galería de Arte, 1990
 Glusberg, Jorge. Rogelio Polesello: Epi e hipergeometría. Buenos Aires: Ediciones de Arte Gaglianone, 1984
 López Anaya, Jorge. "Rogelio Polesello: The neo baroque as metaphor of our era". In Rogelio Polesello: Recent works. Panamá: Museum Galería de Arte, 1992
 Masotta, Oscar. "Rogelio Polesello y el mito de las profanaciones". In Rogelio Polesello. Buenos Aires. Galería Bonino, 1966
 Noé, Luis Felipe. "Polesello encuentra a Polesello". In Rogelio Polesello. Buenos Aires: Galería Lirolay, 1962
 Pau-Llosa, Ricardo. Un acercamiento a Rogelio Polesello. Buenos Aires: Ediciones de Arte Gaglianone, 1984
 Progresiones. Buenos Aires: Palais de Glace, 1995
 Rogelio Polesello en el Museo Nacional de Bellas Artes. Buenos Aires: Museo Nacional de Bellas Artes, 2000
 Uribe, Basilio. "Rogelio Polesello, o las proposiciones del ojo". In Rogelio Polesello. México D.F.: Museo de Arte Moderno, 1974

References

External links
 

1939 births
2014 deaths
Argentine muralists
Argentine painters
Argentine male painters
Argentine sculptors
Male sculptors
People from Buenos Aires
Argentine contemporary artists